Eremophila spongiocarpa is a flowering plant in the figwort family, Scrophulariaceae and is endemic to Western Australia. It is a compact shrub with many tangled branches, flattened, succulent leaves, hairy sepals and creamy white petals which are spotted red on the inside.

Description
It has stiff, hairy, sometimes spiny branches which become glabrous as they age.

The petal tube is white to creamy-white and has red spots inside the tube. The outside of the petal tube and its lobes are densely hairy but the inside surface of the lobes is mostly glabrous apart from the middle part of the lower lobe. The inner part of the tube is hairy, especially on the lower surface. Two of the 4 stamens extend beyond the end of the petal tube whilst the other 2 are enclosed. Flowering mainly occurs between June and August and is followed by fruits which are dry, nearly spherical,  in diameter, very hairy  with a spongy covering.

Taxonomy and naming 
Eremophila spongiocarpa was first formally described by Robert Chinnock in 2007 and the description was published in Eremophila and Allied Genera: A Monograph of the Plant Family Myoporaceae. The specific epithet is from the Latin spongiocarpa, 'spongy fruit'.

Distribution and habitat 
This eremophila is only known from a small area around a large seasonal marsh northwest of Newman in the Pilbara biogeographic region.

Conservation
Eremophila spongiocarpa is classified as "Priority One" by the Western Australian Government Department of Parks and Wildlife, meaning that it is known from only one or a few locations which are potentially at risk.

References

spongiocarpa
Eudicots of Western Australia
Endemic flora of Western Australia
Plants described in 2007
Taxa named by Robert Chinnock